The Benefit (translit. Al Maslaha) is a 2012 Egyptian action film directed by Sandra Nashaat.

Synopsis
A very serious and strict officer goes after a dangerous drug dealer to take revenge for his brother, in an attempt to try and stop the drug and weapon dealing business in Sinai.

Cast 
 Ahmed El Sakka
 Ahmed Ezz
 Hanan Tork
 Salah Abdallah
 Ahmed El-Saadany
 Zeina
 Kinda Allouch
 Mohamed Farrag
 Mondher Rayahneh

References

External links
 

2012 films
2012 action films
2010s Arabic-language films
Egyptian action films